George E. Stone (February 9, 1946 – December 30, 1993) was an American professional basketball player who spent several seasons in the American Basketball Association (ABA). He was drafted in the ninth round of the 1968 NBA draft (115th pick overall) by the Los Angeles Lakers, but never played for them or any other NBA team.

A 6'7" forward from Marshall University, Stone played four seasons (1968–1972) in the ABA as a member of the Los Angeles / Utah Stars and Carolina Cougars. Stone played a key role in the Stars making the 1970 ABA Finals, leading the team in scoring during the playoffs at 23.6 points per game. He averaged 13.6 points per game over the course of his career and ranked tenth in ABA history in three point field goal percentage (.323). He also won a league championship with the Utah Stars (the year the team relocated) in 1971.

Stone died of a heart attack on December 30, 1993.

References

1946 births
1993 deaths
American men's basketball players
Basketball players from Kentucky
Carolina Cougars players
Los Angeles Lakers draft picks
Los Angeles Stars draft picks
Los Angeles Stars players
Marshall Thundering Herd men's basketball players
People from Murray, Kentucky
Utah Stars players
Small forwards